Albert Mannheimer (9 March 1913, in New York City, New York – 19 March 1972, in Los Angeles County, California) was an American writer, principally of screenplays, including the Academy Award-nominated screenplay for Born Yesterday, which screenplay also received the Writers Guild of America award for Best Written American Comedy Award.

He was a protégé of philosopher-novelist Ayn Rand in the late 1940s and early 1950s. His relationship with Rand is covered in two recent books - Ayn Rand and the World She Made by Anne C. Heller and Goddess of the Market by Jennifer Burns.

Selected work 
Broadway Melody of 1940 - uncredited work
Song of the Open Road
Three Daring Daughters
Born Yesterday
Bloodhounds of Broadway
Gidget (television series)
Love on a Rooftop

External links

American male screenwriters
1913 births
1972 deaths
20th-century American male writers
20th-century American screenwriters